Viktor Schnieder was a German cross-country skier who competed in the 1920s. He won a bronze medal in the 18 km event at the 1927 FIS Nordic World Ski Championships.

External links

German male cross-country skiers
Year of birth missing
Year of death missing
FIS Nordic World Ski Championships medalists in cross-country skiing
20th-century German people